881 (eight hundred [and] eighty-one) is the natural number following 880 and preceding 882.

881 is:
 a prime number
 a Paid Toll Free telephone number prefix in the USA
 the Port of Los Angeles Long Wharf, California State Historic Landmark #881
 In astronomy, NGC 881 is an Sc type galaxy in the constellation Cetus.
 A bilingual play on words when text chatting in Mandarin Chinese or bilingually Mandarin Chinese and English. "881" is pronounced ba ba yi in Mandarin, and thus puns on "bye-bye." Probably an elaboration of the similar pun on "88" (ba-ba). See 88 (number).
 The international telephone dialing code for the Global Mobile Satellite System
 A musical comedy-drama film.

References

Integers